The 2022 Le Samyn was the 54th edition of the Le Samyn road cycling one day race in Belgium. It was a 1.1-rated event on the 2022 UCI Europe Tour and the first event in the 2022 Belgian Road Cycling Cup.

Teams
Eleven UCI WorldTeams, eight UCI ProTeams, and six UCI Continental teams made up the twenty-five teams that participated in the race. 116 of 164 riders finished the race.

UCI WorldTeams

 
 
 
 
 
 
 
 
 
 
 

UCI ProTeams

 
 
 
 
 
 
 
 

UCI Continental Teams

Result

References

External links 
 

Le Samyn
Le Samyn
Le Samyn